Cafer Tosun (born 20 November 1999) is a Turkish professional footballer who plays as a midfielder for Elazığspor on loan from İstanbulspor.

Professional career
Tosun made his professional debut for Trabzonspor in a 3-0 Süper Lig win over MKE Ankaragücü on 23 November 2019.

Honours
Trabzonspor
Turkish Cup: 2019–20

References

External links
 
 
 

1999 births
People from Düzköy
Living people
Turkish footballers
Turkey youth international footballers
Association football midfielders
Trabzonspor footballers
1461 Trabzon footballers
Sarıyer S.K. footballers
İnegölspor footballers
İstanbulspor footballers
Elazığspor footballers
Süper Lig players
TFF Second League players
TFF Third League players